Great Tree is a hamlet in southeast Cornwall, England, UK. It is situated one mile north of East Looe on the B3253 road.

Looe Bay Holiday Park, a large holiday park and campsite, is located at Great Tree.

References

Hamlets in Cornwall